Oisterwijk is a railway station located in the centre of Oisterwijk, Netherlands. The station was opened on 1 May 1865 and is located on the Breda–Eindhoven railway between Tilburg and Eindhoven. The train services are operated by Nederlandse Spoorwegen.

Train services
The following services currently call at Oisterwijk:
2x per hour local services (stoptrein) Tilburg Universiteit - Weert

Bus services
There is a bus stop outside the station called Station NS.

Services 205 and 289 call at this station, as well as service 140 from and to 's-Hertogenbosch and Tilburg.

External links
NS website 
Dutch Public Transport journey planner 

Railway stations in North Brabant
Railway stations opened in 1865
Railway stations on the Staatslijn E
Oisterwijk